Frederick Warde (18 March 1852 – 14 May 1899) was an English first-class cricketer active 1871–77 who played for Kent. He was born in West Farleigh; died in West Malling.

References

1852 births
1899 deaths
English cricketers
Kent cricketers
People from West Farleigh